Swiftcurrent Glacier is in Glacier National Park in the U.S. state of Montana.The glacier is on the east (Glacier County) side of the Continental Divide arête known as the Garden Wall. Swiftcurrent Glacier is one of several glaciers that are being monitored to determine stream flow alterations that occur due to glacial retreat. Compared to other glaciers in Glacier National Park, Swiftcurrent Glacier has experienced relatively slow retreat.

See also
List of glaciers in the United States
Glaciers in Glacier National Park (U.S.)

References

Glaciers of Glacier County, Montana
Glaciers of Glacier National Park (U.S.)
Glaciers of Montana